The 2009 British Columbia general election was held on May 12, 2009, to elect members of the Legislative Assembly in the Canadian province of British Columbia. The British Columbia Liberal Party (BC Liberals) formed the government of the province prior to this general election under the leadership of Premier Gordon Campbell. The British Columbia New Democratic Party (BC NDP) under the leadership of Carole James was the Official Opposition.

The election was the first contested on a new electoral map completed in 2008, with the total number of constituencies increased from 79 in the previous legislature to 85. Under amendments to the BC Constitution Act passed in 2001, BC elections are now held on fixed dates which are the second Tuesday in May every four years.

A second referendum on electoral reform was held in conjunction with the election.

The election did not produce a significant change in the province's political landscape. The BC Liberals, who had been in power since the 2001 provincial election, were returned to power, constituting the first time in 23 years a party has won three elections in a row. As a result of the seat redistribution, both the Liberals and the New Democrats gained seats, and both parties increased their popular vote by less than one per cent over 2005. Each party lost two incumbent MLAs: the BC NDP's Jenn McGinn and Charlie Wyse, and the Liberals' John Nuraney and Wally Oppal were defeated. All other seat changes in the election resulted from the new seats or from retiring incumbents.

Voter turnout was 50.99% of eligible voters (1,651,567 registered voters).

Political parties

British Columbia Liberal Party

New Democratic Party of British Columbia

Green Party of British Columbia

Minor parties

Timeline of the campaign

April 10, 2008, passage of the Electoral Districts Act, 2008 moving BC from 79 to 85 constituencies.

October 29, 2008, by-elections in Vancouver-Burrard and Vancouver-Fairview, both won by the New Democrats.

April 14, 2009, the campaign will officially begin when the writ is issued.

April 24, 2009 1pm close of nominations for the election.

May 12, 2009, Election day.

Debates

There was one TV debate featuring the leaders of the three major parties: Gordon Campbell, Carole James, and Jane Sterk on all three major BC networks on Sunday May 3 at 5:00 p.m.

CKNW had a debate of the three leaders on April 23 from 8:30 a.m. to 10:00 a.m.

CBC Radio One had a debate of the three leaders on April 21 at 7:30 a.m.

Opinion polls

Results

Source: 
 The BC Refederation Party was previously known as the Western Refederation Party.

Results by riding 
Names in bold indicate party leaders and cabinet ministers.
The victorious Member of the Legislative Assembly (MLA) for each district has a coloured bar to the left of his or her name.
Incumbents who did not seek re-election are denoted by †
Because of the realignment of electoral boundaries, most incumbents did not represent the entirety of their listed district during the preceding legislative term.

Northern British Columbia

|-
| style="background:whitesmoke;"|Nechako Lakes
||
|John Rustad4,949 (55.76%)
|
|Byron Goerz3,133 (35.29%)
|
|Gerard Riley559 (6.30%)
|
|Mike Summers(Refed.)  235 (2.65%)
||
|John Rustad
|-
| style="background:whitesmoke;"|North Coast
|
|Herb Pond3,110 (34.98%)
||
|Gary Coons5,097 (57.33%)
|
|Lisa Girbav683 (7.69%)
|
|
||
|Gary Coons
|-
| style="background:whitesmoke;"|Peace River North
||
|Pat Pimm3,992 (41.35%)
|
|Jackie Allen1,293 (13.98%)
|
|Liz Logan1,010 (10.92%)
|
|Arthur A. Hadland (Ind.)  2,899 (31.33%)Sue Arntson (Refed.)  58 (0.62%)
||
| style="text-align:center;"|(vacant)
|-
| style="background:whitesmoke;"|Peace River South
||
|Blair Lekstrom4,801 (63.08%)
|
|Pat Shaw2,057 (27.03%)
|
|Grant Fraser553 (7.00%)
|
|Donna Young (Ind.)  220 (2.89%)
||
|Blair Lekstrom
|-
| style="background:whitesmoke;"|Prince George-Mackenzie
||
|Pat Bell9,816 (56.05%)
|
|Tobias Lawrence6,452 (36.84%)
|
|Kevin Creamore1,245 (7.11%)
|
|
||
|Pat Bell
|-
| style="background:whitesmoke;"|Prince George-Valemount
||
|Shirley Bond9,072 (50.61%)
|
|Julie Carew6,737 (37.58%)
|
|Andrej De Wolfe1,225 (6.83%)
|
|Don Roberts (Refed.)  113 (0.63%) Gordon Dickie (Cons.)  780 (4.35%)
||
|Shirley Bond 
|-
| style="background:whitesmoke;"|Skeena
|
|Donny Van Dyk4,328 (37.46%)
||
|Robin Austin5,865 (50.77%)
|
|Anita Norman467 (4.04%)
|
|Mike Brousseau (Cons.)  893 (7.73%)
||
|Robin Austin
|-
| style="background:whitesmoke;"|Stikine
|
|Scott Groves3,829 (45.16%)
||
|Doug Donaldson4,274 (50.41%)
|
|Roger Benham375 (4.43%)
|
|
||
|Dennis MacKay†
|-

Kootenays

|-
| style="background:whitesmoke;"|Columbia River-Revelstoke
|
|Mark McKee5,093 (37.95%)
||
|Norm Macdonald7,419 (55.29%)
|
|Sarah Svensson907 (6.76%)
|
|
||
|Norm Macdonald
|-
| style="background:whitesmoke;"|Kootenay East
||
|Bill Bennett8,404 (51.21%)
|
|Troy Sebastian5,844 (35.62%)
|
|Jen Tsuida549 (3.35%)
|
|Wilf Hanni (Cons.)  1,612 (9.82%)
||
|Bill Bennett
|-
| style="background:whitesmoke;"|Kootenay West
|
|Brenda Binnie4,072 (22.38%)
||
|Katrine Conroy12,126 (66.65%)
|
|Andy Morel1,791 (9.84%)
|
|Zachary Crispin (Comm.)   204 (1.13%)
||
|Katrine Conroy
|-
| style="background:whitesmoke;"|Nelson-Creston
|
|Josh Smienk5,191 (31.42%)
||
|Michelle Mungall9,060 (54.83%)
|
|Sean Kubara1,189 (7.20%)
|
|David Duncan (Cons.)1,083 (6.65%)
||
|Corky Evans†
|-

Okanagan, Shuswap and Boundary

|-
| style="background:whitesmoke;"|Boundary-Similkameen
||
|John Slater6,681
|
|Lakhvinder Jhaj5,869
|
|Robert Grieve1,691
|
|Joe Cardoso (Cons.)  3,596
| colspan="2"  style="background:whitesmoke; text-align:center;"|new district
|-
| style="background:whitesmoke;"|Kelowna-Lake Country
||
|Norm Letnick10,283
|
|Matthew Reed5,251
|
|Ryan Fugger1,375
|
|Mary-Ann Graham (Cons.)  2,253Alan Clarke (Ind.)     571
||
|Al Horning†
|-
| style="background:whitesmoke;"|Kelowna-Mission
||
|Steve Thomson11,506
|
|Tisha Kalmanovich 5,566
|
|Crystal Wariach1,563
|
|Mark Thompson (Cons.)  2,531  Daniel Thorburn (Refed.)   51  Silverado Socrates (Ind.)  130
||
|Sindi Hawkins†
|-
| style="background:whitesmoke;"|Penticton
||
|Bill Barisoff10,346
|
|Cameron Phillips7,331
|
|Julius Bloomfield3,685
|
|Chris Delaney (Cons.)   2,095 Wendy Dion (Refed.)   78
||
|Bill Barisoff
|-
| style="background:whitesmoke;"|Shuswap
||
|George Abbott10,764
|
|Steve Gunner7,051
|
|Michel Saab2,539
|
|Beryl Ludwig (Cons.)   2,374  Chris Emery (BCMP)  361
||
|George Abbott
|-
| style="background:whitesmoke;"|Vernon-Monashee
||
|Eric Foster9,015
|
|Mark Olsen7,698
|
|Huguette Allen4,029
|
|Dean Skoreyko (Cons.)   1,972 R.J. Busch (Refed.)   76Gordon Campbell (Not Affil.) 1,397
||
|Tom Christensen†
|-
| style="background:whitesmoke;"|Westside-Kelowna
||
|Ben Stewart10,334
|
|Tish Lakes5,656
|
|Robin McKim1,617
|
|Peter Neville (Cons.)  1,772
||
|Rick Thorpe†
|-

Thompson and Cariboo

|-
| style="background:whitesmoke;"|Cariboo-Chilcotin
||
|Donna Barnett6,259 (47.85%)
|
|Charlie Wyse6,171 (47.18%)
|
|Eli Taylor650 (4.97%)
|
|
||
|Charlie Wyse
|-
| style="background:whitesmoke;"|Cariboo North
|
|Bruce Ernst6,501 (45.95%)
||
|Bob Simpson7,004 (49.51%)
|
|Doug Gook643 (4.54%)
|
|
||
|Bob Simpson
|-
| style="background:whitesmoke;"|Fraser-Nicola
|
|Ella Brown5,830 (42.72%)
||
|Harry Lali6,703 (49.12%)
|
|Desiree Maher-Schley891 (6.53%)
|
|Dian Brooks (Refed.)223 (1.63%)
||
|Harry Lali
|-
| style="background:whitesmoke;"|Kamloops-North Thompson
||
|Terry Lake9,830 (46.94%)
|
|Doug Brown9,320 (44.50%)
|
|April Snowe1,418 (6.77%)
|
|Wayne Russell (Refed.)   251 (1.20%)Keston C. Broughton (Work Less)  124 (0.59%)
||
|Kevin Krueger
|-
| style="background:whitesmoke;"|Kamloops-South Thompson
||
|Kevin Krueger12,548 (53.86%)
|
|Tom Friedman8,132 (34.90%)
|
|Bev Markle1,529 (6.56%)
|
|Maria Dobi (Cons.)1,090 (4.68%)
||
|Claude Richmond†
|-

Fraser Valley

|-
| style="background:whitesmoke;"|Abbotsford-Mission
||
|Randy Hawes10,372
|
|Lynn Perrin5,788
|
|Bill Walsh1,611
|
|
||
|Randy Hawes
|-
| style="background:whitesmoke;"|Abbotsford South
||
|John van Dongen9,766
|
|Bonnie Rai4,188
|
|Daniel Bryce1,244
|
|Gurcharan Dhaliwal (Cons.)   1,019Tim Felger (Ind.)   334
||
|John van Dongen
|-
| style="background:whitesmoke;"|Abbotsford West
||
|Mike de Jong8,992
|
|Taranjit Purewal5,106
|
|Karen Durant970
|
|Dalbir Benipal (Cons.)  1,043
||
|Mike de Jong
|-
| style="background:whitesmoke;"|Chilliwack
||
|John Les8,138
|
|Mason Goulden5,908
|
|Fraea Bolding1,523
|
|Benjamin Besler (Cons.)   2,672
||
|John Les
|-
| style="background:whitesmoke;"|Chilliwack-Hope
||
|Barry Penner8,985
|
|Gwen O'Mahony5,638
|
|Guy Durnin951
|
|Hans Mulder (Cons.)   1,198Dorothy-Jean O'Donnell (P.F.)   93
||
|Barry Penner
|-
| style="background:whitesmoke;"|Fort Langley-Aldergrove
||
|Rich Coleman15,139
|
|Gail Chaddock-Costello   7,492
|
|Travis Erbacher1,765
|
|Jordan Braun (Refed.)   387
||
|Rich Coleman
|-
| style="background:whitesmoke;"|Langley
||
|Mary Polak13,295
|
|Kathleen Stephany8,400
|
|Ron Abgrall1,788
|
|
||
|Mary Polak
|-
| style="background:whitesmoke;"|Maple Ridge-Mission
|| 
|Marc Dalton8,802
|
|Mike Bocking8,738
|
|Michael Gildersleeve1,387
|
|Ian Vaughan (Reform)   325
| colspan="2"  style="background:whitesmoke; text-align:center;"|new district
|-
| style="background:whitesmoke;"|Maple Ridge-Pitt Meadows
|
|Ken Stewart9,498
||
|Michael Sather9,772
|
|Rob Hornsey1,149
|
|Jay Ariken (Refed.)   140 Chum Richardson (Ind.)   202
||
|Michael Sather
|-

Surrey

|-
| style="background:whitesmoke;"|Surrey-Cloverdale
||
|Kevin Falcon13,815
|
|Deborah Payment 6,567
|
|Kevin Purton1,651
|
|
||
|Kevin Falcon
|-
| style="background:whitesmoke;"|Surrey-Fleetwood
|
|Jagmohan Singh6,860
||
|Jagrup Brar8,852
|
|Christin Geall1,120
|
|Chamkaur Sandhu (Con.)   818
| colspan="2"  style="background:whitesmoke; text-align:center;"|new district
|-
| style="background:whitesmoke;"|Surrey-Green Timbers
|
|Rani Mangat3,624
||
|Sue Hammell10,965
|
|Dan Kashagama488
|
|
||
|Sue Hammell
|-
| style="background:whitesmoke;"|Surrey-Newton
|
|Ajay Caleb4,011
||
|Harry Bains10,709
|
|Trevor Loke759
|
|George Gidora (Comm.)   58
||
|Harry Bains
|-
| style="background:whitesmoke;"|Surrey-Panorama
||
|Stephanie Cadieux11,820
|
|Debbie Lawrance8,675
|
|Murray Weisenburger1,290
|
|
||
|Jagrup Brar
|-
| style="background:whitesmoke;"|Surrey-Tynehead
||
|Dave Hayer8,814
|
|Pat Zanon7,257
|
|Gerald Singh717
|
|
||
|Dave Hayer
|-
| style="background:whitesmoke;"|Surrey-Whalley
|
|Radhia Benalia4,083
||
|Bruce Ralston10,453
|
|Bernadette Kennan1,189
|
|
||
|Bruce Ralston
|-
| style="background:whitesmoke;"|Surrey-White Rock
||
|Gordon Hogg15,121
|
|Drina Allen6,668
|
|Don Pitcairn2,118
|
|David Charles Hawkins (Reform)   464
||
|Gordon Hogg
|-

Richmond and Delta

|-
| style="background:whitesmoke;"|Delta North
|
|Jeannie Kanakos8,490
||
|Guy Gentner10,381
|
|Matthew Laine938
|
|Marc McPherson (Cons.)   756
||
|Guy Gentner
|-
| style="background:whitesmoke;"|Delta South
|
|Wally Oppal9,945
|
|Dileep Athaide2,940
|
|Duane Laird555
||
|Vicki Huntington (Ind.)   9,977John Shavluk (Ind.)   60
||
|Val Roddick†
|-
| style="background:whitesmoke;"|Richmond Centre
||
|Rob Howard10,483
|
|Kam Brar4,949
|
|Michael Wolfe1,213
|
|Kang Chen (NAP)409
||
|Olga Ilich†
|-
| style="background:whitesmoke;"|Richmond East
||
|Linda Reid10,853
|
|Shawkat Hasan5,998
|
|Stephen Rees1,211
|
|Wei Ping Chen (NAP)   419
||
|Linda Reid
|-
| style="background:whitesmoke;"|Richmond-Steveston
||
|John Yap13,167
|
|Sue Wallis5,925
|
|Jeff Hill1,491
|
|Barry Chilton (Cons.)  1,082
||
|John Yap
|-

Vancouver's eastern suburbs

|-
| style="background:whitesmoke;"|Burnaby-Deer Lake
|
|John Nuraney7,591 (45.67%)
||
|Kathy Corrigan8,103 (48.75%)
|
|Bruce Friesen 928 (5.58%)
|
|
||
|John Nuraney
|-
| style="background:whitesmoke;"|Burnaby-Edmonds
|
|Lee Rankin6,385 (38.36%)
||
|Raj Chouhan8,647 (51.94%)
|
|Carrie McLaren1,122 (6.74%)
|
|Dan Cancade (Lbt.)   493 (2.96%)
||
|Raj Chouhan
|-
| style="background:whitesmoke;"|Burnaby-Lougheed
||
|Harry Bloy9,207 (48.45%)
|
|Jaynie Clark8,511 (44.79%)
|
|Helen Chang1,285 (6.76%)
|
|
||
|Harry Bloy
|-
| style="background:whitesmoke;"|Burnaby North
||
|Richard T. Lee9,880 (48.19%)
|
|Mondee Redman9,332 (45.51%)
|
|Doug Perry1,292 (6.30%)
|
|
||
|Richard T. Lee
|-
| style="background:whitesmoke;"|Coquitlam-Burke Mountain
||
|Douglas Horne8,644 (56.93%)
|
|Heather McRitchie5,393 (35.46%)
|
|Jared Evans907 (5.96%)
|
|Paul Geddes (Lbt.)   266 (1.75%)
| colspan="2"  style="background:whitesmoke; text-align:center;"|new district
|-
| style="background:whitesmoke;"|Coquitlam-Maillardville
|
|Dennis Marsden9,145 (44.64%)
||
|Diane Thorne9,818 (47.93%)
|
|Stephen Reid1,040 (5.08%)
|
|Doug Stead (Ind.)   481 (2.35%)
||
|Diane Thorne
|-
| style="background:whitesmoke;"|New Westminster
|
|Carole Millar8,240 (34.61%)
||
|Dawn Black13,418 (56.36%)
|
|Matthew Laird2,151 (9.03%)
|
|
||
|Chuck Puchmayr†
|-
| style="background:whitesmoke;"|Port Coquitlam
|
|Bernie Hiller7,896 (38.85%)
||
|Mike Farnworth11,121 (54.71%)
|
|Cole Bertsch994 (4.89%)
|
|Brent Williams (YPP)   137 (0.67%)Lewis Dahlby (Lbt.)   178 (0.88%)
||
|Mike Farnworth
|-
| style="background:whitesmoke;"|Port Moody-Coquitlam
||
|Iain Black9,979 (52.15%)
|
|Shannon Watkins7,614 (39.80%)
|
|Rebecca Helps1,261 (6.59%)
|
|Donna Vandekerkhove (Refed.)    82 (0.43%)James Filippelli (YPP)  198 (1.03%)
||
|Iain Black
|-

Vancouver

|-
| style="background:whitesmoke;"|Vancouver-Fairview
||
|Margaret MacDiarmid11,034 (47.09%)
|
|Jenn McGinn9,881 (42.17%)
|
|Vanessa Violini 2,232 (9.52%)
|
|Matthew Barens (Reform)  85 (0.36%) Graham Clark (Ind.)  165 (0.70%) Alex Frei (Refed.)  37 (0.16%)
||
|Jenn McGinn
|-
| style="background:whitesmoke;"|Vancouver-False Creek
||
|Mary McNeil9,223 (56.40%)
|
|Jordan Parente4,502 (27.53%)
|
|Damian Kettlewell2,144 (13.11%)
|
|Otto Grecz (Refed.)    27 (0.16%)David Hutchinson (Cons.)    385 (2.35%)Michael Halliday (Ind.)    73 (0.45%)
| colspan="2"  style="background:whitesmoke; text-align:center;"|new district
|-
| style="background:whitesmoke;"|Vancouver-Fraserview
||
|Kash Heed9,549 (49.29%)
|
|Gabriel Yiu8,801 (45.43%)
|
|Jodie Emery904 (4.67%)
|
|Andrew Stevano (Refed.)  118 (0.61%)
||
|Wally Oppal
|-
| style="background:whitesmoke;"|Vancouver-Hastings
|
|Haida Lane6,323 (32.32%)
||
|Shane Simpson10,857 (55.49%)
|
|Ryan Conroy2,012 (10.28%)
|
|Dietrich Pajonk (Sex)    99 (0.51%)Chris Telford (Work Less)    198 (1.01%)Donna Petersen (P.F.)   76 (0.39%)
||
|Shane Simpson
|-
| style="background:whitesmoke;"|Vancouver-Kensington
|
|Syrus Lee 7,678 (40.63%)
||
|Mable Elmore9,930 (52.55%)
|
|Doug Warkentin1,288 (6.82%)
|
|
||
|David Chudnovsky†
|-
| style="background:whitesmoke;"|Vancouver-Kingsway
|
|Bill Yuen6,518 (38.96%)
||
|Adrian Dix9,229 (55.17%)
|
|Rev Warkentin 699 (4.18%)
|
|Matt Kadioglu (Lbt.)    171 (1.02%)Charles Boylan (P.F.)    112 (0.67%)
||
|Adrian Dix
|-
| style="background:whitesmoke;"|Vancouver-Langara
||
|Moira Stilwell10,643 (58.87%)
|
|Helesia Luke6,310 (35.16%)
|
|Jean-Michel Toriel1,067 (5.97%)
|
|
||
|align=center|(vacant)
|-
| style="background:whitesmoke;"|Vancouver-Mount Pleasant
|
|Sherry Wiebe3,638 (20.80%)
||
|Jenny Kwan11,196 (63.95%)
|
|John Boychuk2,508 (14.28%)
|
|Peter Marcus (Comm.)   171 (0.97%)
||
|Jenny Kwan
|-
| style="background:whitesmoke;"|Vancouver-Point Grey
||
|Gordon Campbell11,546 (50.38%)
|
|Mel Lehan9,232 (40.28%)
|
|Stephen Kronstein2,012 (8.78%)
|
|John Ince (Sex)    130 (0.56%)
||
|Gordon Campbell
|-
| style="background:whitesmoke;"|Vancouver-Quilchena
||
|Colin Hansen15,731 (70.22%)
|
|James Young4,746 (20.74%)
|
|Laura-Leah Shaw2,024 (9.04%)
|
|
||
|Colin Hansen
|-
| style="background:whitesmoke;"|Vancouver-West End
|
|Laura McDiarmid5,735 (32.65%)
||
|Spencer Herbert9,926 (56.51%)
|
|Drina Read1,582 (9.01%)
|
|Scarlett Lake (Sex)    90 (0.51%) John Clarke (Lbt.)   196 (1.12) Menard Caissy (Not Affil.)    36 (0.20%)
||
|Spencer Herbert
|-

North Shore and Sunshine Coast

|-
| style="background:whitesmoke;"|North Vancouver-Lonsdale
||
|Naomi Yamamoto10,323
|
|Janice Harris7,789
|
|Michelle Corcos1,791
|
|Ian McLeod (Cons.)862
Ron Gamble (Reform)  232
||
|Katherine Whittred†
|-
| style="background:whitesmoke;"|North Vancouver-Seymour
||
|Jane Thornthwaite13,426
|
|Maureen Norton6,212
|
|Daniel Quinn2,116
|
|Gary Hee (Cons.)931
||
|Daniel Jarvis†
|-
| style="background:whitesmoke;"|Powell River-Sunshine Coast
|
|Dawn Miller7,818
||
|Nicholas Simons13,276
|
|Jeff Chilton1,436
|
|Allen McIntyre (Refed.)  249
||
|Nicholas Simons
|-
| style="background:whitesmoke;"|West Vancouver-Capilano
||
|Ralph Sultan15,292
|
|Terry Platt3,291
|
|Ryan Windsor1,699
|
|David O. Marley (Ind.) 1,489Eddie Petrossian (Cons.)  710Tunya Audain (Lbt.)  182
||
|Ralph Sultan
|-
| style="background:whitesmoke;"|West Vancouver-Sea to Sky
||
|Joan McIntyre10,101
|
|Juliana Buitenhuis 4,214
|
|Jim Stephenson4,082
|
|
||
|Joan McIntyre
|-

Vancouver Island

|-   
| style="background:whitesmoke;"|Alberni-Pacific Rim   
|   
|Dianne St. Jacques5,605 (31.73%)
||
|Scott Fraser10,488 (59.36%)
|
|Paul Musgrave1,324 (7.49%)
|   
|Dallas Hills (Refed.)250 (1.42%)
||   
|Scott Fraser
|-   
| style="background:whitesmoke;"|Comox Valley
||
|Don McRae13,886 (47.30%)
|
|Leslie McNabb12,508 (42.61%)
|   
|Hazel Lennox2,577 (8.78%)
|   
|Paula Berard (Refed.)  266 (0.90%)Barbara Biley (P.F.) 120 (0.41%)
||   
|align=center|(vacant)
|-   
| style="background:whitesmoke;"|Cowichan Valley   
|   
|Cathy Basskin9,258 (35.71%)
||
|Bill Routley12,468 (48.40%)
|   
|Simon Lindley3,062 (11.79%)
|   
|Jason Murray (Cons.)  924 (3.56%)Michial Moore (Refed.)  139 (0.54%)
| colspan="2"  style="background:whitesmoke; text-align:center;"|new district
|-   
| style="background:whitesmoke;"|Nanaimo   
|   
|Jeet Manhas8,012 (36.31%)
||
|Leonard Krog11,842 (53.33%)
|   
|Dirk Becker2,028 (9.14%)
|   
|Linden Shaw (Refed.)  271 (1.22%)
||   
|Leonard Krog
|-   
| style="background:whitesmoke;"|Nanaimo-North Cowichan   
|
|Rob Hutchins8,426 (35.52%)
||
|Doug Routley12,888 (54.33%)
|   
|Ian Gartshore2,135 (9.00%)
|
|Ron Fuson (Refed.)271 (1.15%)
||   
|Doug Routley
|-   
| style="background:whitesmoke;"|North Island   
|   
|Marion Wright8,937 (39.19%)
||
|Claire Trevena11,865 (52.03%)
|   
|Philip Stone1,670 (7.32%)
|
|William Mewhort (Ind.)  333 (1.46%)
||   
|Claire Trevena
|-   
| style="background:whitesmoke;"|Parksville-Qualicum   
||
|Ron Cantelon13,716 (51.42%)
|   
|Leanne Salter10,136 (38.00%)
|   
|Wayne Osborne2,573 (9.64%)
|   
|Bruce Ryder (Refed.)   251 (0.94%)
||   
|Ron Cantelon
|-

 - Previously held by BC Liberal Stan Hagen, who died in office on January 20, 2009.

Greater Victoria

|-   
| style="background:whitesmoke;"|Esquimalt-Royal Roads   
|   
|Carl Ratsoy6,579
||
|Maurine Karagianis11,514
|   
|Jane Sterk3,664
|   
|
||   
|Maurine Karagianis
|-   
| style="background:whitesmoke;"|Juan de Fuca   
|   
|Jody Twa6,866
||
|John Horgan11,520
|   
|James Powell1,749
|   
|
||   
|John Horgan   
|-   
| style="background:whitesmoke;"|Oak Bay-Gordon Head   
||   
|Ida Chong11,877
|   
|Jessica Van der Veen11,316
|   
|Steven Johns2,330
|   
|
||   
|Ida Chong   
|-   
| style="background:whitesmoke;"|Saanich North and the Islands   
|| 
|Murray Coell13,120
|   
|Gary Holman12,875
|   
|Tom Bradfield3,220
|
|
||   
|Murray Coell   
|-   
| style="background:whitesmoke;"|Saanich South   
|   
|Robin Adair11,215
||   
|Lana Popham11,697
|   
|Brian Gordon1,664
|
|Douglas Christie (West Can.)  235
||   
|David Cubberley†
|-   
| style="background:whitesmoke;"|Victoria-Beacon Hill   
|   
|Dallas Henault6,375
||
|Carole James13,400
|   
|Adam Saab4,106
|   
|Saul Andersen (Ind.)319
||   
|Carole James
|-   
| style="background:whitesmoke;"|Victoria-Swan Lake   
|   
|Jesse McClinton5,754
||
|Rob Fleming13,119
|   
|David Wright2,628
|   
|Bob Savage (Refed.)174
||   
|Rob Fleming
|-

References

Elections BC: 2009 Voting Results

Further reading

External links 
 Elections BC
 BC Election 2009 by Sacha Peter with comprehensive information on the election
 Election Prediction Project - BC 2009
 UBC ESM Election Prediction Voter Transition Matrix
 TrendLines Research Weekly chart tracking of the Federal & BC seat projection models
 Legislative Assembly Library Election Weblinks

Party platforms 
In order of release
 Conservative Party Platform (A Clear Vision for British Columbia)
 Green Party Platform 2009 (A Better Plan for BC)
 New Democratic Party Platform 2009 (Take Back Your BC)
 Liberal Party Platform 2009 (Keep BC Strong)

2009
2009 elections in Canada
2009 in British Columbia
May 2009 events in Canada